Washington Heights is a 2002 drama film directed by Alfredo De Villa and starring Manny Pérez, Tomas Milian, and Danny Hoch.  It concerns a young comic book artist and his struggle to deal with his father's paralysis following a robbery of his shop in the Washington Heights neighborhood of New York City.

External links
 
 

2002 films
2002 drama films
Washington Heights, Manhattan
Films set in New York City
American drama films
Films directed by Alfredo De Villa
2000s English-language films
2000s American films